2,4-DB or 4-(2,4-dichlorophenoxy)butyric acid is a selective systemic phenoxy herbicide used to control many annual and perennial broad-leaf weeds in alfalfa, peanuts, soybeans, and other crops.  Its active metabolite, 2,4-D, inhibits growth at the tips of stems and roots.  It is classified in toxicity class III.    It shows some evidence of toxicity to dogs and cats, such as changes in body weight and reduced numbers of offspring, when fed 25-80 milligrams per kilogram of body weight for prolonged periods.  Tests of carcinogenicity in this range yielded differing results.  It is moderately toxic to fish.

References 

Carboxylic acids
Auxinic herbicides
Chloroarenes
Phenol ethers